St Margarets railway station, in the London Borough of Richmond upon Thames in south-west London, is in Travelcard Zone 4. It was opened by the London & South Western Railway on 2 October 1876 on the existing line from Waterloo to Windsor. It is a minor stop,  down the line from Waterloo.

The station and all trains serving it are operated by South Western Railway. The station entrance is at the east end, nearer to London. The station is sometimes shown as St Margarets (London) to differentiate it from the station of the same name in Hertfordshire.

Services

The typical off-peak service of eight trains per hour all terminating at Waterloo comprises:
4 direct via Richmond and Clapham Junction
2 circuitously via Kingston and Wimbledon
2 circuitously via Hounslow.

Its trains towards London call at platform 1; almost all call at all stations to Waterloo (nationally known as stopping services). This island platform also faces the fast London-bound track as platform 2 (disused for getting off/boarding). Other trains call at the outbound platform (Platform 3).

Public transport and footways to all-services station
The station is a short bus journey to major stop Twickenham railway station from the end of its street. South of the tracks a parallel street has pavements to both sides to the same station, less circuitously.

References

External links

Railway stations in the London Borough of Richmond upon Thames
Former London and South Western Railway stations
Railway stations in Great Britain opened in 1876
Railway stations served by South Western Railway
Twickenham
St Margarets, London